500 Nations is an eight-part American documentary television series that was aired on CBS in 1995 about the Native Americans of North and Central America. It documents events from the Pre-Columbian era to the end of the 19th century. Much of the information comes from text, eyewitnesses, pictorials, and computer graphics.
The series was hosted by Kevin Costner, narrated by Gregory Harrison, and directed by Jack Leustig. It included the voice talents of Eric Schweig, Gordon Tootoosis, Wes Studi, Cástulo Guerra, Tony Plana, Edward James Olmos, Patrick Stewart, Gary Farmer, Tom Jackson, Tantoo Cardinal, Dante Basco, Sheldon Peters Wolfchild, Tim Bottoms, Michael Horse, Graham Greene, Floyd Red Crow Westerman, Amy Madigan, Frank Salsedo, and Kurtwood Smith. The series was written by Jack Leustig, Roberta Grossman, Lee Miller (head of research), and W. T. Morgan, with John M. D. Pohl.

The documentary series is based on the eponymous 480-page book by Alvin M. Josephy Jr., published in 1994.
The documentary re-aired on Discovery Times in 2006.

Episodes

Episode 1: Wounded Knee Legacy and the Ancestors
The series begins "where our story ends" with eyewitness accounts of Wounded Knee. The Ancestors next offers excerpts from Native American Creation stories, then explores three early North American cultures, including the 800-room Pueblo Bonito in the arid southwest, the Cliff Palace at Mesa Verde and Cahokia, the largest city in the U.S. before 1800.

Episode 2: Mexico
A history of the native nations of Mexico from pre-Columbian times, through the period of European contact and colonization, including the rise and fall of the Toltecs and the growth of Tenochtitlan, the capital of the Aztec empire.

Episode 3: Clash of Cultures
As Native nations defy a plundering advance of Spanish expeditions in the Caribbean and what will become the southeastern United States, two undefeatable attacks, muskets and disease, cause thousands of deaths.

Episode 4: Invasion of the Coast
Tensions rise as more foreigners arrive in North America, and affect the lives of native peoples. In Jamestown, the story of the Powhatan princess, Pocahontas, unfolds. Thanksgiving at Plymouth leads to a bloody colonial Indian war in 1675.

Episode 5: Cauldron of War
European powers fight to control American resources, turning native homelands into a Cauldron of War. Many indigenous nations side with France, but when the defeated country leaves its native allies vulnerable, a determined leader, Pontiac, rises to prominence.

Episode 6: Removal
Being forced to follow the Trail of Tears displaces Native Americans even though they adopt American ways. Shawnee leader Tecumseh sparks a return to traditional ways but The Indian Removal Act is enforced in 1830. Many stoically accept; others resist.

Episode 7: Roads Across the Plains
Lifestyles of native peoples of the Great Plains end as American settlers destroy huge buffalo herds. Though native leaders pursue peace, they are massacred at Sand Creek. The massacre provokes severe repercussions.

Episode 8: Attack on Culture
Legislative attacks on native ways included the disbanding of communal land. Today, native cultures are allowed to renew, and to remember the lifestyles of America's original people, and the hardships they endured.

Software
There was an educational computer game based on the documentary made by Microsoft Home the same year it was released.

References

External links

Official 500 Nations website

1995 American television series debuts
1995 American television series endings
1990s American documentary television series
Documentaries about historical events
CBS original programming